Savinka is a rural locality (a selo) and the administrative center of Savinsky Selsoviet of Aleysky District, Altai Krai, Russia. The population was 418 as of 2016. There are 10 streets.

Geography 
Savinka is located on the left bank of the Karymka River, 36 km northwest of Aleysk (the district's administrative centre) by road. Mokhovskoye is the nearest rural locality.

Ethnicity 
The village is inhabited by Russians and others.

References 

Rural localities in Aleysky District